In physical geography and geology, a horst is a raised fault block bounded by normal faults. Horsts are typically found together with grabens. While a horst lifted or remains stationary, the grabens on either side subside. This is often caused by extensional forces pulling apart the crust. Horsts may represent features such as plateaus, mountains, or ridges on either side of a valley. Horsts can range in size from small fault-blocks, up to large regions of stable continent that have not been not folded or warped by tectonic forces. 

The word Horst in German means "mass" or "heap," and was first used in the geological sense in 1883 by Eduard Suess in The Face of the Earth.

Geomorphology 
Horsts may have either symmetrical or asymmetrical cross-sections. If the normal faults to either side have similar geometry and are moving at the same rate, the horst is likely to be symmetrical and roughly flat on top. If the faults on either side have different rates of vertical motion, the top of the horst will most likely be inclined and the entire profile will be asymmetrical. Erosion also plays a significant role in how symmetrical a horst appears in cross-section.

Horsts and hydrocarbon exploration 
Horsts can form structural petroleum traps. In many rift basins around the world, the vast majority of discovered hydrocarbons are found in conventional traps associated with horsts. For example, much of the petroleum found in the Sirte Basin, Libya (of the order of tens of billions of barrels of reserves) are found on large horst blocks such as the Zelten Platform and the Dahra Platform and on smaller horsts such as the Gialo High.

Examples 
The Vosges Mountains in France and Black Forest in Germany are examples of horsts, as are the Table, Jura, the Dole mountains and the Rila - Rhodope Massif including the well defined horsts of Belasitsa (linear horst), Rila mountain (vaulted domed shaped horst) and Pirin mountain - a horst forming a massive anticline situated between the complex graben valleys of Struma and that of Mesta. 

Larger areas where the continent remains stable with horizontal table-land stratification can be considered horsts, such as the Russian Plain, Arabia, India and Central South Africa. This is in distinction to folded regions such as some mountain chains of Eurasia.

The Midcontinent Rift System in North America is marked by a series of horsts extending from Lake Superior to Kansas.

The Rwenzori Mountains in the East African Rift are an upthrown fault block, and are the highest non-volcanic, non-orogenic mountains in the world.

The Vosges Mountains in France were formed by isostatic uplift in response to the opening of the Rhine Graben, a major extensional basin.

In Palestine, the Central Highlands and Eastern Plateau surround the Jordan Valley, forming a horst and graben system

See also 
 Horst and graben
Basin and range topography
 Fault-block mountain
 Plateau

Notes

References

External links 
 

Structural geology
Tectonic landforms